Spencer Abbott (born April 30, 1988) is a Canadian former professional ice hockey forward. He played in the National Hockey League (NHL) with the Toronto Maple Leafs and Chicago Blackhawks.

Playing career
Abbott spent his collegiate career playing for the Maine Black Bears in the NCAA Men's Division I Hockey East conference. In his senior year, Abbott's outstanding play was rewarded with a unanimous selection to the 2011–12 Hockey East First-Team All-Stars, as well as being named the 2011–12 Athletic Republic Player of the Year. He led the league in scoring that season, collecting 21 goals and 62 points in 39 games. He finished his four-year stint with the Black Bears having registered 146 points in 151 games.

He signed with the Toronto Maple Leafs franchise in March 2012 and joined them at the end of the 2011–12 season as an undrafted free agent. He played in three games with the Maple Leafs' American Hockey League (AHL) affiliate, the Toronto Marlies, that season. The following year he attended the Leafs training camp, but was assigned to the Marlies on September 15, 2012, to participate in the upcoming AHL training camp. In the 2013–14 season, Abbott was again part of the Maple Leafs training camp, but was assigned to the Marlies on September 20. He was recalled by the Maple Leafs after Nikolai Kulemin was injured in practice. He made his NHL debut on October 5, 2013, in the Maple Leafs home opener against the Ottawa Senators. Abbott spent most of the 2013–14 season with the Marlies, collecting 17 goals and 69 points in 63 games. He was named an AHL Second Team All-Star and was selected to participate in the AHL's 2014 All-Star Classic but missed the game due to injury. On September 14, 2015 Abbott signed a one-year contract with the Maple Leafs. 

In the 2014–15 season, Abbott struggled with the Marlies, collecting 24 points in 46 games. On February 26, 2015, Abbott was traded to the Chicago Blackhawks in exchange for defenceman T. J. Brennan. He was reassigned to the Blackhawks' AHL affiliate, the Rockford IceHogs, where he remained for the duration of the season, recapturing his offence to produce 21 points in 19 games and a further 6 points in 8 playoff games.

As an impending free agent, Abbott signed his first contract abroad in agreeing to a one-year contract with Swedish club Frölunda HC of the Swedish Hockey League (SHL) on June 16, 2015. He had a very successful season in Sweden, including winning the Swedish national championship and the Champions Hockey League (CHL). In 51 SHL contests, Abbott tallied 14 goals and 22 assists.

On July 1, 2016, he returned to the Chicago Blackhawks as a free agent on a one-year, two-way deal. He attended Blackhawks training camp, but was reassigned to Rockford after passing through waivers. Abbott began the 2016–17 season, in his second stint with the Rockford IceHogs. Amongst the IceHogs scoring leaders, Abbott was recalled to replace Tyler Motte who had been assigned to Rockford. He made his debut for Chicago, his second NHL appearance, in a 4–3 victory over the Buffalo Sabres on January 5, 2017. He was returned to Rockford following the game and proceeded to collect 35 points in 53 games. At the NHL trade deadline, Abbott was dealt by the Blackhawks, along with Sam Carrick to the Anaheim Ducks in exchange for Kenton Helgesen and a 7th round pick in the 2019 NHL Entry Draft on March 1, 2017.

As a free agent from the Ducks, Abbott opted to extend his tenure with affiliate, the San Diego Gulls, signing a one-year AHL contract on September 25, 2017. In the 2017–18 season, while leading the Gulls in scoring with 20 points in 17 games, Abbott was traded to the Binghamton Devils in exchange for future considerations on December 8, 2017. He initially refused to report to Binghamton and was suspended without pay by the team. On December 22, he signed for the remainder of the season with Swiss-based club, EHC Kloten in the National League.

Helping Kloten avoid relegation, Abbott left as a free agent and returned for a second tenure in the SHL, agreeing to terms with Mora IK on September 17, 2018. In the 2018–19 season, Abbott led Mora's offense, registering 29 assists and 36 points in 42 regular season games. He also had 3 points in 5 games against rivals Leksands IF. On June 26, 2019, Abbott left Mora to continue in the SHL, agreeing to a one-year contract with the newly promoted Leksands.

On December 29, 2020, Abbott signed with the Augsburger Panther of the Deutsche Eishockey Liga (DEL).

Career statistics

Awards and honours

References

External links
 

1988 births
Living people
AHCA Division I men's ice hockey All-Americans
Augsburger Panther players
Canadian expatriate ice hockey players in Sweden
Canadian expatriate ice hockey players in Switzerland
Canadian expatriate ice hockey players in the United States
Canadian ice hockey forwards
Chicago Blackhawks players
Ice hockey people from Ontario
Frölunda HC players
EHC Kloten players
Leksands IF players
Maine Black Bears men's ice hockey players
Mora IK players
Ontario Junior Hockey League players
Rockford IceHogs (AHL) players
San Diego Gulls (AHL) players
Sportspeople from Hamilton, Ontario
Toronto Maple Leafs players
Toronto Marlies players
Undrafted National Hockey League players